Richmond Tetteh Ankrah (born 22 February 2000) is a Ghanaian professional footballer who plays as a centre-back for Malaysia Super League club Selangor, on loan from Accra Lions.

Club career

Accra Lions
Ankrah began his career with Accra Lions academy. He was part of the club to win the title in the 2020–21 Ghana Division One and help the club earned promotion to the Ghana Premier League next season.

Selangor
On 23 March 2022, Ankrah was loaned to Malaysia Super League side Selangor for the remainder of their 2022 season, and being initially assigned to the reserve team. On 5 July 2022, he received his first call-up to the senior squad, and made his debut against Melaka United with a 2–0 away loss in the league match. His first goal for Selangor came on 16 November, in a 3–1 home win against Terengganu in the first leg of the Malaysia Cup semi-finals tie.

Career statistics

Club

References

2000 births
Living people
Ghanaian expatriates in Malaysia
Ghanaian footballers
Selangor FA players